Ezekiel Stephen Spruill (born September 11, 1989) is an American professional baseball pitcher who is a free agent. He has played in Major League Baseball (MLB) for the Arizona Diamondbacks, in the KBO League for the Kia Tigers, and in the Chinese Professional Baseball League (CPBL) for the Lamigo Monkeys.

Career

Atlanta Braves
Spruill was drafted by the Atlanta Braves in the 2nd round, 70th overall, in the 2008 Major League Baseball draft. He made his professional debut with the GCL Braves. Spruill spent the 2008-2012 seasons in the Braves minor league system, reaching as high as Double-A with the Mississippi Braves. The Braves added Spruill to the team's 40-man roster on November 20, 2012.

Arizona Diamondbacks
After the 2012 season, the Braves traded Spruill, Nick Ahmed, Martín Prado, Randall Delgado, and Brandon Drury to the Diamondbacks for Justin Upton and Chris Johnson.

Spruill made his MLB debut on June 21, 2013 against the Cincinnati Reds at Chase Field. He pitched one inning in relief, giving up one hit, no runs, and picked up his first career strikeout.

In August, Spruill made 2 starts, pitching a combined 7 innings while allowing 10 runs; in both starts he received the loss.

Boston Red Sox
On December 12, 2014, he was traded to the Boston Red Sox in exchange for Myles Smith. He was designated for assignment on July 3, 2015 to create room for Noe Ramirez on the 40 man roster.

Kia Tigers
On December 2, 2015, Spruill signed a one-year, $700,000 deal with the Kia Tigers of the KBO. In 2016 with Kia, Spruill registered a 5.27 ERA and 10-13 record with 125 strikeouts in 30 appearances.

Lamigo Monkeys
On February 15, 2017, Spruill signed with the Lamigo Monkeys of the CPBL. On June 18, 2017, Spruill threw a no-hitter against the Fubon Guardians. However, the game was not scored as a no-hitter because the game was called in the 7th inning due to rain.

Texas Rangers
On December 14, 2017, Spruill signed a minor league contract with the Texas Rangers. He was released in March of 2018 without making any official spring training appearances.

Return to Lamigo Monkeys
On April 10, 2018, Spruill signed with the Lamigo Monkeys as the team's foreign backup pitcher. He will pitch for the club's farm team and can only be promoted if one of the three other foreign pitchers on the active roster is released. On May 27, 2018, Spruill was called up to the Monkeys following the release of Darin Downs. Spruill later re-signed with the Monkeys for the 2019 season. He was later released on May 20, 2019.

References

External links
, or CPBL

1989 births
Living people
American expatriate baseball players in South Korea
American expatriate baseball players in Taiwan
Arizona League Diamondbacks players
Arizona Diamondbacks players
Baseball players from Virginia
Gulf Coast Braves players
KBO League pitchers
Kia Tigers players
Lamigo Monkeys players
Lynchburg Hillcats players
Major League Baseball pitchers
Mississippi Braves players
Mobile BayBears players
Myrtle Beach Pelicans players
Pawtucket Red Sox players
Phoenix Desert Dogs players
Reno Aces players
Rome Braves players
Sportspeople from Chesapeake, Virginia
United States national baseball team players